Secreto de Amor (Secret of Love) is an American telenovela produced by Venevisión International in 2001. The telenovela was filmed in Miami, Florida and it starred Scarlet Ortiz and Jorge Aravena as the main protagonists while Colombian actress Aura Cristina Geithner and Venezuelan actress Astrid Gruber starred as the main antagonists.

Plot
Maria Clara Carvajal is a beautiful, modern girl who works hard in order to support her ailing mother and younger sister. She is in love with Carlos Raúl, a young mechanic. Despite their poor financial situation, they are prepared to get married. however, their plans will not be realized when Carlos Raúl is fired from his job, and decides to move to Miami to seek a better life just a few days before their wedding. Maria Clara promises to wait for Carlos Raul while he looks for a good job in the United States.

In Miami, Carlos Raúl begins to work as a valet in a luxurious hotel owned by the wealthy Serrano Zulbarán family. Here she meets Barbara Serrano Zulbarán, one of the family heirs. Barbara is instantly attracted to Carlos, and they begin a passionate affair. Carlos Raúl is attracted by Barbara's beauty and wealth, and he forgets all about Maria Clara.

Meanwhile, in Caracas, Maria Clara's mother dies, and pressured by her ambitious sister Andrea, she moves to Miami together with her god-mother Coralia. Within a short time, she discovers Carlos Raúl's deception. After a while, Maria Clara meets Lisandro, Barbara's handsome widower brother who is captivated by her beauty and kindness. Through several circumstances, Maria Clara marries Lisandro even though she doesn't love him. With both Maria Clara and Carlos Raúl stuck in loveless marriages, will they still be able to revive the love they once felt for each other?

Cast

International Broadcastings

References

External links
 

|}

2001 telenovelas
2001 American television series debuts
2002 American television series endings
Venevisión telenovelas
Television shows set in Miami
Venezuelan telenovelas
Spanish-language telenovelas
2001 Venezuelan television series debuts
2002 Venezuelan television series endings
Spanish-language American telenovelas